AHC Potaissa Turda is a men's handball club from Turda, Romania, that plays in the Romanian Handball League. Potaissa Turda is a notable Romanian team in the last decade. In the last four years, is the only team that have qualified to the Final 4 of the national championships, in every season. Potaissa Turda won the EHF Challenge Cup in 2018, after a final against AEK Athens.

Turda was promoted to the first division in 2011.  

Potaissa Turda's fairytail story began back in 2007, when their home sports hall, Gheorghe Baritiu, was inaugurated and the team's players could play finally in Turda. For example, one of the squad's members was the actual team president, Flaviu Constantin Sâsâeac, who used to play for Turda, and also being the team president, since 2003. 

Another reason why Potaissa's early success is not that surprising, can be that the club has more youth squads, around 220 children and young players representing Turda in national competitions.

Kits

Honours 
 EHF Challenge Cup  
Winners (1): 2017–18  
Runners-up (1): 2016–17
 Liga Națională  
Third place (4): 2014, 2017, 2018, 2019

European record 

For the first time in their short history, AHC Potaissa Turda have reached the Challenge Cup finals for the second year running. After the loss from a year before, against Sporting CP, Turda had the power to come back stronger, winning the first major trophy for the city from Cluj county. By beating AEK H.C. with 59-49 on aggregate, Potaissa Turda became the fourth team from Romania to ever lift the Challenge Cup, after Steaua Bucharest, UCM Reșița (three times between 2007-2009) and HC Odorhei.

Current squad 
Squad for the 2020–21 season

Goalkeepers
  Ionuț Irimuș 
  George Șelaru

Wingers
RW
  Roland Thalmaier 
  Daniel Pop
LW 
  Răzvan Pavel
  Alexandru Ghivil
  Denis Vereș
Line players 
  Huba Talas
  Nenad Savić (team captain)
  Dragoș Iancu
  Andrei Totoi
  Gabriel Dumitriu

Back players
LB
  Georgică Cîntec  
  Radu Lazăr
  Teodor Pinţoiu
  Milos Dragas
CB 
  Marius Szőke
  Mihai Rohozneanu
RB
  Radu Cristian Ghiță
  Roman Zacaciurin

Technical staff 
Staff for the 2019–20 season

Head Coach
  Horațiu Gal
Assistant
  Ionuț Ștef
Masseur
  Ionuț Mercean
Club President
  Flaviu Sâsâeac
Head of Youth Department 
  Aurel Oroian
Sports Director
  Cosmin Sălăjan

References

External links
Official website 

Romanian handball clubs
Turda
Handball clubs established in 2000
2000 establishments in Romania
Liga Națională (men's handball)